Admiral Sir Willoughby Thomas Lake KCB (8 January 1773 – 18 February 1847) was a Royal Navy officer who went on to be Commander-in-Chief, North American Station.

Naval career
Born the son of Sir James Winter Lake, 3rd Baronet and Joyce Crowther, Lake joined the Royal Navy around 1790. By 1795 he was in command of the sloop HMS Rattler. He was promoted to post captain in 1796.

In her he captured four privateers before leaving her in June 1806 for HMS Gibraltar, the ship in which, in 1807, he chased Napoleon Bonaparte's brother along the French coast. He also commanded  during an attack on Santander in 1812. He went on to be Commander-in-Chief, North American Station in 1824 and was promoted to Admiral of the White in 1842.

Family
In 1795 he married Charlotte MacBride, daughter of John MacBride; they had one daughter.

References

Further reading
 

 

1773 births
1847 deaths
Royal Navy admirals
Knights Commander of the Order of the Bath
Irish sailors in the Royal Navy